Phillip Francis Dougherty (September 20, 1912September 28, 2000) was a professional American football Center in the National Football League. He played one season for the Chicago Cardinals (1938).

References

1912 births
2000 deaths
Players of American football from San Francisco
American football centers
Santa Clara Broncos football players
Chicago Cardinals players